Kuro Arirang is a 1989 South Korean film directed by Park Jong-won. It stars Ok So-ri and Lee Geung-young and marks the debut of Choi Min-sik and Shin Eun-kyung. The film caused a stir over labor issues.

Premise
The film depicts the story of four people working in a sewing factory in Guro Industrial Complex in Seoul and the problems they face.

Cast
 Ok So-ri
 Lee Geung-young
Yoon Ye-ryeong
 Choi Min-sik
Lee Ki-yeol
Kim Na-young
 Shin Eun-kyung
Lee Min-gyeong
Lee Gwang-hui
Kim Ui-sang

External links
 
 

South Korean drama films
1989 films
1989 drama films
1980s Korean-language films